Lyonpo Yeshey Zimba (born 10 October 1952) is a political figure from Bhutan. He was Prime Minister (Chairman of the Council of Ministers) of Bhutan two times: first from 2000 to 2001; then from 20 August 2004 to 5 September 2005. During this period, each minister took turns holding the chairmanship for one year.

He completed his high school in North Point School and got his bachelor's degree from St. Joseph's College, Darjeeling, an affiliate of the University of North Bengal. Yeshey later graduated with an MA in economics from the University of Wisconsin–Madison.

He was the managing director of Royal Monetary Authority of Bhutan from 1983 to 1986, and the chairman from 1998 to 2002. He was Minister of Finance from August 1998 to July 2003.

Zimba served as Minister of Trade and Industry until resigning in mid-2007 to participate in the March 2008 general election. Following the election, he became Minister of Works and Human Settlement on 11 April 2008.

References

1952 births
Living people
University of North Bengal alumni
University of Wisconsin–Madison College of Letters and Science alumni
Prime Ministers of Bhutan
Finance ministers of Bhutan
Trade ministers of Bhutan
Industry ministers of Bhutan
Infrastructures ministers of Bhutan
Bhutanese MNAs 2013–2018
21st-century Bhutanese politicians
Druk Phuensum Tshogpa politicians
Bhutanese politicians
Bhutanese MNAs 2008–2013
Druk Phuensum Tshogpa MNAs